Emilie M. Hafner-Burton is a professor at the UC San Diego School of Global Policy and Strategy (formerly the Graduate School of International Relations and Pacific Studies or IR/PS) and director of the School’s Laboratory on International Law and Regulation. She is the author of the book "Making Human Rights a Reality."

Education 
Hafner-Burton received her Ph.D. in political science from the University of Wisconsin—Madison in 2003, honorary M.A. from Oxford University, M.A. in political science from University of Wisconsin—Madison in 1999, and B.A. in political science and philosophy from Seattle University in 1995.

Career
 Karl Deutsch Award: presented annually to a scholar under the age of 40 who is judged to have made, through a body of publications, the most significant contribution to the study of International Relations and Peace Research by International Studies Association. 2012.
 Princeton University, Class of 1934 University Preceptor, Woodrow Wilson School. 2009-2012.
 American Political Science Association Helen Dwight Reid Award for Best Dissertation in International Relations, Law, and Politics. 2005.
 American Political Science Association Prize Best Dissertation in Human Rights. 2004.
 Distinction in International Relations, University of Wisconsin—Madison. 2001.
 Distinction in Political Methodology, University of Wisconsin—Madison. 2000.
 Distinction, Seattle University. 1995.
 Kennedy Award: highest student achievement in Political Science, Seattle University. 1995.
 Her Story Award: highest student achievement in Women’s Studies, Seattle University. 1995.

Grants, fellowships and gifts
 Princeton University, Bobst Center for Peace and Justice, project grant, 2008.
 Princeton University, Dean of Faculty, project grant, 2008.
 Princeton University, Woodrow Wilson School for Public and International Affairs, grant, 2008.
 Princeton University, Dean of Faculty book grant, 2007.
 Princeton University, Center for Globalization and Governance, for “Intergovernmental Organizations in Action,” 2006.
 International Studies Association Workshop Grant, for “Preventing Human Rights Abuse,” 2006.
 Postdoctoral Research Prize, Oxford University, Nuffield College. 2003 to 2006.
 University Dissertator Fellowship, University of Wisconsin—Madison. 2002 to 2003.
 National Science Foundation, Dissertation Improvement Grant in Political Science. 2002.
 Scott Kloeck-Jenson International Pre-Dissertation Grant, University of Wisconsin. 2002.
 Graduate Student Council, Vilas Travel Grant, University of Wisconsin—Madison. 2002.
 Center for International Security and Cooperation, MacArthur Fellow, Stanford University. 2001 to 2003.
 MacArthur Consortium, Global Studies Scholarship, University of Wisconsin. 2000 to 2001.
 European Union Center Fellowship, University of Wisconsin—Madison. 2000.
 European Networking Series, the British Council. June 1999.
 Women in International Security: Graduate Symposium on International Security. WashingtonD.C. June 1999.
 Women’s International League for Peace and Freedom (WILPF) International Fellowship in Disarmament and Development. 1997 to 1998.
 National Education Achievement Foundation Scholarship Award. 1994 to 1995.

Books
 Making Human Rights a Reality, Princeton University Press, 2013.
 Forced to Be Good: Why Trade Agreements Boost Human Rights, Cornell University Press, 2009.

Articles

“A Behavioral Approach to International Cooperation.” With Brad L. LeVeck, David G. Victor and James H. Fowler. International Organization, forthcoming.
 “Sovereignty Costs, Human Rights Institutions, and Democratization.” With Ed Mansfield and Jon Pevehouse.  British Journal of Political Science, forthcoming 2013.
 “When Do Governments Resort to Election Violence?” With Susan Hyde and Ryan Jablonski. British Journal of Political Science, forthcoming 2013.
 “The Cognitive Revolution and the Political Psychology of Elite Decision Making.” With D. Alex Hughes and David G. Victor. Perspectives on Politics, forthcoming 2013 (summer issue).
“When Governments Use Election Violence to Stay in Power.” With Susan Hyde and Ryan Jablonski. British Journal of Political Science, forthcoming 2013.
“The Latin Bias: Regions, the Anglo-American Media and Human Rights, 1981-2000.” With James Ron. International Studies Quarterly, forthcoming 2013.
“International Regimes for Human Rights.” Annual Review of Political Science, 2012, 15, pp. 265–286.
“International Relations for International Law.” With David G. Victor and Yanatan Lupu, American Journal of International Law, 2012, 106(1).
“Ward, Trade, and Distrust: Why Trade Agreements Don’t Always Keep the Peace.” With Alexander H. Montgomery. Conflict Management and Peace Science, 2012, 29(3).
“Emergency and Escape: Explaining Derogations from Human Rights Treaties.” With Laurence Helfer and Chris Farris. International Organization, 2011, 65(4), pp. 673–707.
“Mainstreaming International Governance: The Environment, Gender, and IO Performance in the European Union.” With Mark A. Pollack. Review of International Organization, 2010, 5, pp. 285–313.
“Tortured Relations: Human Rights Abuses and Counter terrorism Cooperation.” With Jacob Shapiro. PS: Political Science and Policy, 2010, 43, pp. 415–419.
“Seeing Double: Human Rights Impact Through Qualitative and Quantitative Eyes?” With James Ron. World Politics, 2009, 61(2), pp. 360–401.
“Network Analysis For International Relations.” With Miles Kahler and Alexander H. Montgomery. International Organization, Spring 2009, 63, pp. 559–92.
“Sticks and Stones: Naming and Shaming the Human Rights Enforcement Problem" International Organization, October 2008, 62, pp. 689–716.
“The Power Politics of Regime Complexity: Human Rights Conditionality in Europe.” Perspectives on Politics, March 2009, 7(1), pp. 33–38.
“Mainstreaming Gender in the European Union: Getting the Incentives Right.” With Mark A. Pollack. Comparative European Politics, April 2009, 7, pp. 114–138.
“Globalization and the Power Politics of International Economic Networks.” With Alexander H. Montgomery, in Networked Politics: Agency, Power, and Government. Miles Kahler, ed., Cornell University Press 2009.
“International Organizations Count: What Statistics Tell Us About IOs.” With Jana von Stein and Erik Gartzke, Journal of Conflict Resolution, April 2008, 52(2), pp. 175–188.
“Power or Plenty: Do International Trade Organizations Shape Economic Sanctions?” With Alexander H. Montgomery. Journal of Conflict Resolution, April 2008, 52(2), pp. 213–242.
“The Hegemon’s Purse: No Economic Peace Between Democracies.” With Alexander H. Montgomery. Journal of Peace Research, 2008, 45(1), pp. 111–120.
“International Human Rights Law and the Politics of Legitimacy: Repressive States and Human Rights Treaties.” With Kiyoteru Tsutsui and John Meyer. International Sociology, 2008, 23(1), pp. 115–141.
“Preventing Human Rights Abuse.” With James Ron. Journal of Peace Research, Hafner-Burton and Ron, eds., 2007, 44(4), pp. 379–383.
“Justice Lost! The Failure of International Human Rights Law to Matter Where Needed Most.” With Kiyoteru Tsutsui. Journal of Peace Research, 2007, 44(4), pp. 407–425.
“Power Positions: International Organizations, Social Networks, and Conflict.” With Alexander Montgomery. Journal of Conflict Resolution, 2006, 50(1), pp. 3–27.
“Trading Human Rights: How Preferential Trade Agreements Influence Government Repression.” International Organization, 2005, 59(3), pp. 593–629.
“Human Rights Practices in a Globalizing World: The Paradox of Empty Promises.” With Kiyo Tsutsui. American Journal of Sociology, 2005, 110(5), pp. 1373–1411.
“Right or Robust? The Sensitive Nature of Political Repression in an era of Globalization.” Journal of Peace Research, 2005, 42(6), pp. 679–698.
  With Mark A. Pollack.
  With Mark A. Pollack.
  With Mark A. Pollack.

References

External links
 Official website
 "Improving Human Rights - A Conversation with Emilie Hafner-Burton", Ideas Roadshow, 2016

Living people
University of Wisconsin–Madison College of Letters and Science alumni
Year of birth missing (living people)
American women political scientists
American political scientists
University of California, San Diego faculty
International relations scholars
21st-century American women